Lauren Allison Frost (born May 25, 1985) is an American actress and singer who is best known for her recurring role as Ruby Mendel in the hit Disney Channel Original Series Even Stevens and the follow-up Disney Channel Original Movie The Even Stevens Movie.

Early life

She attended Downers Grove South High School for her first year before moving to California.

Career

She co-starred in the Disney Channel original series Even Stevens as Ren's best friend Ruby, from 2001 to 2003. She also co-starred in the follow-up film The Even Stevens Movie. She also is the star of a TV series called Web Girl as Casey Collins. Lauren Frost is an actress and singer-songwriter, who performed nationally and internationally with Barbra Streisand in Ms. Streisand's Timeless concert Tours since 1999/12/31. Lauren portrayed and sang as "Young Barbra" in the live Timeless concerts, and on the Emmy-winning Fox TV Special and Grammy-nominated CD Recordings. Currently, Lauren is continuing her acting career, and performing with her band, "Blue Lou."

Lauren sang "On the Way to Becoming Me" at the American Film Institute’s Tribute to Barbra Streisand. She has been a featured Singing Soloist at The Hollywood Bowl with John Mauceri and the Hollywood Bowl Orchestra, at the Kennedy Center with Marvin Hamlisch and the National Symphony Orchestra, and at Heinz Hall
with the Pops Symphony Orchestra.

Filmography

External links
 
 
 

1985 births
American television actresses
Living people
Actresses from Chicago
People from Downers Grove, Illinois
21st-century American women